The Heavenly Waltz (German: Der himmlische Walzer) is a 1948 Austrian comedy film directed by Géza von Cziffra and starring Elfie Mayerhofer, Paul Hubschmid and Inge Konradi.

The film's sets were designed by the art director Fritz Jüptner-Jonstorff. It was shot at the Sievering Studios in Vienna.

Cast

References

External links

Austrian comedy films
1948 comedy films
Films directed by Géza von Cziffra
Austrian black-and-white films
Films about angels
Films shot at Sievering Studios